Thomas Alexander Boyd (July 3, 1898 – January 27, 1935) was an American journalist and novelist, born in Defiance, Ohio.

Boyd was raised by his mother's family due to his father's death before he was born. While still in school, he and a friend enlisted in the U.S. Marine Corps and saw service in France during World War I, where he was gassed in 1918.

Upon discharge from the occupation forces in 1919, Boyd tried several occupations before becoming a writer for newspapers in Minneapolis and St. Paul, Minnesota.  He opened a bookstore, Kilmarnock Books, in St. Paul, which became the locus of literary figures, including Sinclair Lewis.  He was urged to write and produced the 1923 novel Through the Wheat, based in part on his own war experiences and set partly during the Battle of Belleau Wood. Another war novel, The Dark Cloud, followed in 1924, and a book of short stories, Point of Honor, in 1925.
Boyd later remarried and became interested in Socialist causes during the Depression, eventually running as the Communist candidate for governor of Vermont.

He died suddenly in 1935 of a stroke.

Selected works  
 Through the Wheat (1923) novel
 The Dark Cloud (1924) novel
 Points of Honor (1925) stories
 Shadow of the Long Knives (1928) novel
 Simon Girty, the White Savage (1928) biography
 Mad Anthony Wayne (1929) biography
 Light-Horse Harry Lee (1931) biography
 Poor John Fitch (1935) biography
 In Time of Peace (1935) novel

References

External links 
 
 Thomas Boyd Research Notes for Poor John Fitch at Dartmouth College Library

1898 births
1935 deaths
20th-century American novelists
20th-century American male writers
Novelists from Minnesota
American male novelists
People from Defiance, Ohio
United States Marine Corps personnel of World War I
United States Marines